Priestman may refer to:

People
 Anna Priestman (1828–1914), British social reformer and women's rights activist
 Brian Priestman (1927–2014), conductor
 Henry Priestman (MP) (1647–1712), English politician
 Henry Priestman (born 1955), musician
 Jaqueline Priestman, woman famous for her innate electrical abilities
 John Priestman (1855–1941), shipbuilder
 William Dent Priestman (1847–1936), Quaker and combustion engine pioneer, inventor of the first British internal combustion engine to burn a fuel heavier than petrol (1885)
 Jane Priestman (born 1930)
 Richard Priestman (born 1955)

Others
 Priestman Brothers, dredger and excavator manufacturers based in Kingston upon Hull
 Priestman v Colangelo